Plourac'h is a commune in the Côtes-d'Armor department of Brittany in northwestern France.

Population

Inhabitants of Plourac'h are called plouracois in French.

See also
Communes of the Côtes-d'Armor department
List of works of the two Folgoët ateliers
Listing of the works of the Maître de Laz

References

External links

Official website 

Communes of Côtes-d'Armor